Aman may refer to:

People

First names 
 Aman Hambleton (born 1992), Canadian chess grandmaster
 Aman Hayer (born 1979), Bhangra musician
 Aman Verma (actor) (born 1971), Indian actor

Surnames 
 Mohammed Aman (born 1994), Ethiopian middle-distance runner
 Rami Aman, Palestinian journalist and peace activist in the Gaza Strip
 Theodor Aman (1831–1891), Romanian painter

Nicknames 
 Cao Cao (155–220), Chinese warlord of the Three Kingdoms nicknamed "Aman"

Entertainment
 Aman (film), 1967 Bollywood film, by Mohan Kumar, starring Rajendra Kumar and Saira Banu
 A.M.A.N. (TV series), a Greek television comedy series aired by ANT1
 Aman (Tolkien), a fictitious location in J. R. R. Tolkien's legendarium, also known as the Undying Lands
 Aman (album), a 2015 album by Myriam Fares
 "Aman" (song), a 2020 single by Albanian singer Dafina Zeqiri featuring Albanian rappers Ledri Vula and Lumi B

Other
 AMAN (naval exercise), a multilateral naval exercise
 Aman (Islam) or amān, assurance of security or clemency granted to enemies in Islamic law
 Aman Futures Group, a Malaysian multi-level marketing company
 Aman Resorts, a luxury hotel group
 Aman rice, an ecotype of rice
  (A.M.A.N.), the Brazilian Army military academy
 Acute motor axonal neuropathy
  (AMAN), an Indonesian NGO defending customary communities' rights
 Arrival Manager; see Air traffic control
 Military Intelligence Directorate (Israel) ( or Aman)

See also
 Amann
 Amman (disambiguation)
 Ammann (disambiguation)
 Amon (disambiguation)
 Ammon (disambiguation)
 Amun (disambiguation)
 Amanda (given name)